Ostad (also Romanized as Ostād) is a village in Kakhk Rural District, Kakhk District, Gonabad County, Razavi Khorasan Province, Iran. At the 2006 census, its population was 303, in 109 families.

References 

Populated places in Gonabad County